Kim Syster, is a South African actress, dancer and model.

Career
In 2014, she appeared in the SABC1 anthology miniseries When We Were Black as Rachael. Then in 2015, she played Nikki in the fourth season of the SABC2 parliamentary drama 90 Plein Street.She then joined the kykNET soap opera Suidooster as Shahieda Williams. She reprised her role in the third season. She appeared in the kykNET musical teen drama series Sterlopers as Kim McKenzie in 2016. That same year, she joined the series Cape Town for Universal TV as Angel and Fluiters for kykNET as Nikki September.

In 2017, she played Bianca Prins in the sixth season of SABC2 drama series Erfsondes. In 2018, she appeared in the fourteenth and fifteenth seasons of kykNET  soap opera Binnelanders as Dr. Jax Davids. At the same time, she played Sonja Landman in another kykNET drama Spoorloos. In 2020, she played Wilhelmina in the drama Ekstra Medium. In 2021, she appeared in the series Die Sentrum on SABC 2 as Rochelle Williams and Skemerdans on kykNET & kie as Chanel Adonis.

In addition to acting, she is also a dancer working for the Cape Town rugby team The Stormers. Meanwhile, she also acted in the films such as; The Gamechangers, Sonskyn Beperk and Nul is nie niks nie. In 2018, she acted in the Hollywood science fiction horror film Deep Blue Sea 2 directed by Darin Scott.

Filmography

References

External links
 IMDb

Living people
South African film actresses
South African television actresses
South African stage actresses
Year of birth missing (living people)